Mikhael is a 2019 Indian Malayalam-language action thriller film written and directed by Haneef Adeni. It stars Nivin Pauly in the titular role,  with Unni Mukundan, Manjima Mohan, Siddique, JD Chakravarthy and Suraj Venjaramoodu in supporting roles. The music is composed by Gopi Sundar. 

Mikhael was released on 18 January 2019 and received mixed reviews from critics.

Plot
George Peter is an influential gold smuggler and don in Kerala. One day, George and his driver are killed under mysterious circumstances where ACP Muhammed Easa and his colleague CI Isaac John arrives at the spot and discovers that the murder was carried out with a surgical blade, deducing that a doctor was behind it. They start investigating medical stores. 

At the same time, George's younger brother and cold-blooded gangster Marco meets their partners, William Davis and his elder son Abraham to ask whether it was their work. Abraham speaks in a condescending manner, which provokes Marco to shoot Abraham, showing Marco as a sadistic and ruthless criminal. During his funeral, Easa asks William and his younger son Francis about Abraham's murder, but to no avail. One night, a mysterious person shoots Patrick, Davis's secretary. Easa and Isaac take him to Star Hospital where he gets murdered despite being protected with maximum security. This solidifies Easa and Isaac's theory that the murderer is a doctor. 

Meanwhile, A contract killer interrogates a pharmacist to learn the truth about the murders. Both the gangs start believing that someone is after them. Isaac becomes suspicious of Easa since he earlier revealed that he had an informant, but didn't reveal anything about him. Isaac investigates on his own, discovering that Dr. Mikhael John, a young surgeon of Star Hospital is both the killer and the informant. Issac also finds that Easa is helping Mikhael since they had contacted each other several times. He also tells Easa what he has learned in his investigation, forcing Easa to reveal everything in order to prevent the arrest of Dr. Mikhael. 

Past: Mikhael was 10 years old, he was involved in an accident that killed his father John (who is a martial arts trainer). Michael's mother Ancy blamed him for his father's death. Meanwhile, George's son Gerald challenged Jenny, Mikhael's sister to a kung-fu fight in front of the entire school. Jenny defeats him, causing his friends and other students to tease him for losing infront a girl. Depressed over the matter, Gerald commits suicide by jumping from the school terrace. George visits Jenny and ask her to jump from the school terrace in the same way Gerald had jumped or he will kill her entire family. 

After George continuously disturbs and harasses her family, Jenny decides to jump off the school terrace. Before she jumps, Mikhael arrives and saves her. After learning about the harassment, Mikhael files a complaint to the police, but the Sub-Inspector thrashes and warns him, as they are allied with George. Ancy asks him to visit them in Christmas, but he refuses. George later kills Ancy, causing Michael to burn Peter's Audi Q7 car. George and his henchmen catch Michael, beat him brutally and leave him on a railroad track to die. Michael escapes, and eventually catches up George and his driver and kills them both.

Present: Marco learns about Mikhael and Jenny and vows to finish them. Easa also reveals that he ordered Mikhael to kill Patrick, since he was a common connection between both teams and killing him will provoke a gang war. Meanwhile, Jenny gets kidnapped by William and Davis, who learned that Mikhael was responsible for Patrick's death, but Mikhael is able to save Jenny.

William and Francis are arrested by Easa, who also arrest Marco for killing Abraham, but Marco is released on bail. Marco kidnaps Jenny and takes her to the Helipad of a Skyscraper and challenges Mikhael to a fight. Mikhael arrives at the Helipad and fights with Marco. Finally, using a hidden surgical blade in his pocket, Michael is able to kill Marco. The film ends by showing Michael illegal donates Marco's organs to save three people, thus saving his family.

Cast

Production 
Mikhael is the second directorial venture of Haneef Adeni, produced by Anto Joseph under the banner Anto Joseph Film Company. The film was announced on 12 July 2018. The pooja function was held in Kochi on 3 September, with principal photography beginning the same day.

Principal photography ended on November 26, 2018.

Music
The film features songs composed by Gopi Sundar.

Critical reception

The film received mixed reviews upon from critics and audience upon release.

Navamy Sudheesh of The Hindu called the film an average action fare, wrote that "while the film is engaging at some levels, it lacks that raw energy and intensity of a thorough thriller." Manoj Kumar of The Indian Express criticized the film, rating 0.5 in a scale of 5 and calling it a "migraine-inducing incoherent mess, which kills our desire to be entertained." Sowmya Rajendran from The News Minute criticised the direction, script, editing and acting, and wrote that "even if you watch the film knowing what to expect of Haneef Adeni, 'Mikhael' is disappointing", she rated 2 in a scale of 5. Anna M. M. Vetticad of Firstpost rated the film 0.75 in a scale of 5 and wrote that "Nivin Pauly struggles through a pretentious, pompous affair ... the irritating music and pseudo-philosophical mumbo jumbo overshadow both the storyline and the usually reliable Nivin Pauly's natural charm". Litty Simon of Malayala Manorama said, "the slow-paced thriller won't really blow your mind but it comes with enough masala for a Nivin Pauly movie." Calling the film "loud" and "confused", Neelima Menon from Huffington Post wrote that Nivin Pauly "is a thorough misfit" in the film. She was also heavily critical about the film's music. Deepa Sonam of The Times of India rated the movie 2.5 on the scale of 5. The New Indian Express rated it 4.

It was reported that the makers of the film tried to control negative reviews on social media by asking Facebook to remove such posts due to copyright policies; they were able to get Facebook to block two groups which discussed films in an attempt to save the film from getting negative word of mouth.

References

External links
 

2010s Malayalam-language films
Films set in Kerala
Films shot in Kerala
2019 films